"I Feel It Coming" is a song by Canadian singer The Weeknd featuring French electronic duo Daft Punk, from his third studio album, Starboy (2016). It was written by the trio alongside Doc McKinney, Cirkut and Eric Chedeville, being produced by Daft Punk, with The Weeknd, McKinney and Cirkut serving as co-producers. The song was released for digital download on November 18, 2016, alongside "Party Monster", as promotional singles. It was first sent to British contemporary hit radio on November 24, 2016, and it was released to US rhythmic contemporary radio on December 6, 2016, through XO and Republic Records, serving as the album's second single, following their previous collaboration "Starboy". It is also Daft Punk's final single before their breakup in 2021. It was named Song of the Year at the 2018 BMI R&B/Hip Hop Awards.

Composition
The song is composed in the key of E major with a tempo of 93 beats per minute. It follows a chord progression of Gm7/Cm7/A♭(add9)/E♭.

In an interview with Zane Lowe for Beats 1 Radio, the Weeknd stated that he and Daft Punk member Guy-Manuel de Homem-Christo had been mutual friends long before the recording of Starboy. When he visited a recording studio in Paris, France, Daft Punk presented the Weeknd with the draft instrumental for "I Feel It Coming". He claims that he wrote the lyrics in one hour.

Additional production was done by Doc McKinney and Cirkut.

Critical reception
The song received acclaim from critics. In Rolling Stones review of Starboy, Mosi Reeves commended the track, stating that, ""I Feel It Coming," is a gem of Ibiza disco love... [it] is surprisingly sunny and fresh". Reviewing the album for Pitchfork, Mehan Jayasuriya wrote that "both of the Daft Punk collaborations are satisfying, if hardly groundbreaking", describing the song as "a slowed-down version of 'Get Lucky'". Reviewing the album track-by-track, The Independents Christopher Hooten praised the song and said, "the Daft Punk-featuring track initially fall[s] in with Michael Jackson and Toto on a Venn diagram but, crucially, [is] thrown off kilter by a melancholy keyboard line low in the mix in the chorus. [It] could definitely become an iconic track".

Chart performance
The song peaked at number four on the Billboard Hot 100 on the date ending April 15, 2017. As of April 2022, "I Feel It Coming" has sold 6,000,000 copies in the United States, being certified 6× Platinum.

Music video
Directed by Warren Fu, the music video for "I Feel It Coming" premiered on March 9, 2017, on the Weeknd's Vevo channel. As of June 2022, it has surpassed 1 billion views on YouTube. The video was made with the intent to appear as though it was transferred shot footage, and reminiscently edited on Betacam SP, like most music videos had been — prior to the digital age of formatting. Evidence of this can be seen on the slight overall softness to the image and edge bleed as the image transitions to the black bars. The video features the Weeknd meeting a "Stargirl", portrayed by Kiko Mizuhara, on a rocky, barren planet in outer space that shares similarities to Mars. The video also features an appearance by Daft Punk after the song ends.

Charts

Weekly charts

Year-end charts

Certifications

Release history

Notes

References

2016 songs
2016 singles
The Weeknd songs
Daft Punk songs
SNEP Top Singles number-one singles
Songs written by Doc McKinney
Songs written by the Weeknd
Songs written by Thomas Bangalter
Songs written by Guy-Manuel de Homem-Christo
Songs written by Cirkut (record producer)
Song recordings produced by Cirkut (record producer)
Song recordings produced by Daft Punk
Song recordings produced by the Weeknd
Republic Records singles
XO (record label) singles
Music videos directed by Warren Fu